Holy Trinity Church, Yeaveley is a Grade II listed parish church in the Church of England in Yeaveley, Derbyshire.

History

The foundation stone was laid on 8 August 1839 by Revd. W. A. Shirley. and the church opened in 1840. It was built of red brick in Flemish bond with sone and moulded brick dressings.

Parish status
The church is in a joint parish with
All Saints' Church, Brailsford
St James' Church, Edlaston
St Martin's Church, Osmaston
St Michael's Church, Shirley

See also
Listed buildings in Yeaveley

References

Yeaveley
Yeaveley